Thyrocopa usitata is a moth of the family Xyloryctidae. It was first described by Arthur Gardiner Butler in 1881. It is endemic to the Hawaiian islands of Kauai, Oahu and Hawaii.

The length of the forewings is 7–11 mm. Adults are on wing year round. The ground color of the forewings is brown. The pattern is variable. The discal area is sometimes clouded with poorly defined blackish spots in the cell and sometimes there is a curving poorly defined whitish band through the terminal area, sometimes with evenly spaced spots on the distal half of the costa and along the termen at the vein endings. The hindwings are light brown, but the area near the anal margin is sometimes darker brown. The fringe is light brown.

A larva was collected from rotting bark of Acacia koa.

External links

Thyrocopa
Endemic moths of Hawaii
Moths described in 1881